Mississauga—Erin Mills is a provincial electoral district in Ontario, Canada. It elects one member to the Legislative Assembly of Ontario. This riding was created in 2015.

Members of Provincial Parliament

Election results

References

External links 
Map of riding for 2018 election

Ontario provincial electoral districts
Politics of Mississauga